The 2012 Milwaukee IndyFest Presented by XYQ was the eighth round of the 2012 IndyCar Series season. It took place on Saturday, June 16, 2012 at the  Milwaukee Mile, in West Allis, Wisconsin.

Classification

Starting grid

Race results

Notes
 Points include 1 point for pole position and 2 points for most laps led.

Standings after the race

Drivers' Championship

Manufacturers' Championship

Note: Only the top five positions are included for the driver standings.

References

External links

Milwaukee Indy 225
Milwaukee IndyFest
Milwaukee IndyFest
Milwaukee IndyFest